Moorehead Circle was a triple woodhenge constructed about two millennia ago at the Fort Ancient Earthworks in the U.S. state of Ohio.

Robert Riordan, Professor of Archaeology at Wright State University and lead archaeologist investigating the site, estimates that about two hundred wooden posts were set in the outer circle. Following the 2009 Field Season though, this estimate will likely be reevaluated given a huge number of tightly spaced post-molds found on the geographic south of the feature.

Thirty post-molds in all, were found in an eight meter long area excavated on the border of the circle. "A radiocarbon date on charcoal from a remnant trace of a post suggests it was built between 40 BC and AD 130. Burned timber fragments from the pit were dated AD 250 to AD 420."  Both dates fall into the time period of the Hopewell culture, preceding the Fort Ancient culture occupation that predominates the site. The use or uses of the circles has not been determined, although it was likely ceremonial.

Dr. Riordan named the circle in honor of Warren K. Moorehead, first curator of archaeology for the Ohio Historical Society and a leading North American archaeologist around the turn of the twentieth century, who was largely responsible for preservation of the Fort Ancient site.

Other woodhenges have been found in the central part of the United States, including the Cahokia Woodhenge and Mound 72 Woodhenges (both located at the Cahokia site in western Illinois) and the Stubbs Earthworks, which is also a Hopewell culture site located in Warren County, Ohio.

See also
 Cahokia Woodhenge
 List of Hopewell sites

References

 Riordan, Robert. "Report on the Excavations of the Moorehead Circle at Fort Ancient, 2007." Wright State University Laboratory of Anthropology: Fairborn, Ohio 2008.
 Cowan, Frank L.  "An Ohio Hopewell 'Woodhenge,'" in Ohio Archaeology: An Illustrated Chronicle of Ohio's Ancient American Indian Cultures. Orange Frazer Press: Wilmington, Ohio.

External links
 
 
 Fort Ancient Archaeological Park
 Fort Ancient, Ancient Ohio Trail
 Hopewell Ceremonial Earthworks UNESCO World Heritage Nomination

Ohio Hopewell
Fort Ancient culture
Buildings and structures in Warren County, Ohio